Drillia pyramidata is a species of sea snail, a marine gastropod mollusk in the family Drilliidae.

Description
The shell is cerithiiform, strongly corded on the periphery, smooth above it, except a narrow granulated sutural band, below with oblique slight, ribs and revolving striae. The color of the shell is chocolate, the peripheral and sutural nodes whitish. The interior of the aperture is chocolate, with a white band. The length of the shell is 25 mm.

Distribution
This species occurs in the demersal zone of the Atlantic Ocean off West Africa (Senegal, Angola)

References

 Bernard, P.A. (Ed.) (1984). Coquillages du Gabon [Shells of Gabon]. Pierre A. Bernard: Libreville, Gabon. 140, 75 plates pp.
 Gofas, S.; Afonso, J.P.; Brandào, M. (Ed.). (S.a.). Conchas e Moluscos de Angola = Coquillages et Mollusques d'Angola. [Shells and molluscs of Angola]. Universidade Agostinho / Elf Aquitaine Angola: Angola. 140 pp
 Tucker, J.K. 2004 Catalog of recent and fossil turrids (Mollusca: Gastropoda). Zootaxa 682:1–1295

External links
 
 MNHN, Paris: Drillia pyramidata

pyramidata
Gastropods described in 1840